The Church of the Holy Trinity is a Grade I listed parish church of the Church of England in Long Melford, Suffolk, England. It is one of 310 medieval English churches dedicated to the Holy Trinity.

The church was constructed between 1467 and 1497 in the late Perpendicular Gothic style. It is a noted example of a Suffolk medieval wool church, founded and financed by wealthy wool merchants in the medieval period as impressive visual statements of their prosperity.

The church structure is highly regarded by many observers. Its cathedral-like proportions and distinctive style, along with its many original features that survived the religious upheavals of the 16th and 17th centuries, have attracted critical acclaim. Journalist and author Sir Simon Jenkins, former Chairman of the National Trust, included the church in his 1999 book “England’s Thousand Best Churches”. He awarded it a maximum of 5 stars, one of only 18 to be so rated.
The Holy Trinity Church features in many episodes of Michael Wood's BBC television history series Great British Story, filmed during 2011.

History

Origins
A church is recorded as having been on the site since the reign of King Edward the Confessor (1042–1066). It was originally endowed by the Saxon Earl Alric, who bequeathed the patronage of the church, along with his manor at Melford Hall and about 261 acres of land, to the successive Abbots of the Benedictine Abbey of Bury St Edmund's. There are no surviving descriptions of the original Saxon structure, although the roll of the clergy (see below) and the history of the site extend back to the 12th century.

15th-century reconstruction
The church was substantially rebuilt between 1467 and 1497. Of the earlier structures, only the former Lady Chapel (now the Clopton Chantry Chapel) and the nave arcades survive.

The principal benefactor who financed the reconstruction was wealthy local wool merchant John Clopton, who resided at neighbouring Kentwell Hall. John Clopton was a supporter of the Lancastrian cause during the Wars of the Roses and in 1462 was imprisoned in the Tower of London with John de Vere, 12th Earl of Oxford and a number of others, charged with corresponding treasonably with Margaret of Anjou. All of those imprisoned were eventually executed except John Clopton, who somehow made his peace with his accusers and lived to see the Lancastrians eventually triumphant at the Battle of Bosworth in 1485.

The dates of the reconstruction of the church are derived from contemporary wills, which provided endowments to finance the work.

Reconstruction of main tower

In 1710 the main tower was damaged by a lightning strike. It was replaced with a brick-built structure in the 18th century and subsequently remodelled between 1898 and 1903 to its present-day appearance, designed by George Frederick Bodley (Founder of Watts & Co. ) in the Victorian Gothic Revival style. The new tower was closer to its original form with stone and flint facing and the addition of four new pinnacles.

Description

Dimensions
The dimensions of the church are:

Nave

There are nine bays, of which the first five at the western end are believed to date from an earlier structure.

The interior is lit by 74 tracery windows, many of which retain original medieval glass. These include the image of Elizabeth de Mowbray, Duchess of Norfolk, said to have provided the inspiration for John Tenniel's illustration of the Queen of Hearts in Lewis Carroll's Alice's Adventures in Wonderland.

Sanctuary
The sanctuary is dominated by the large reredos, of Caen stone and inspired by the works of Albrecht Dürer. It was installed in 1877, having been donated by the mother of the then Rector Charles Martyn.

On the north side is the alabaster and marble tomb of Sir William Cordell who was the first Patron of the Church after the dissolution of the Abbey of Bury St Edmund's in 1539. On either side of the tomb are niches containing figures that represent the four Cardinal virtues of Prudence, Justice, Temperance and Fortitude.

The sanctuary also holds one of the earliest extant alabaster bas relief panels, a nativity from the second half of the 14th century. The panel was hidden under the floor of chancel, probably early in the reign of Elizabeth I, and was rediscovered in the 18th century. The panel, which may be part of an altar piece destroyed during the Reformation, includes a midwife arranging Mary's pillows and two cows looking from under her bed.

Clopton Chapel

The Clopton Chapel is in the north east corner of the church. It commemorates various Clopton family members and was used by the family as a place of private worship.

The tomb of Sir William Clopton is set into an alcove here, in the north wall. An effigy of Sir William, wearing chain mail and plate armour, is set on top of the tomb. Sir William is known to have died in 1446 and it is therefore believed that this corner of the church predates the late 15th-century reconstruction. There are numerous brasses set in the floor commemorating other members of the Clopton family; two date from 1420, another shows two women wearing head attire in the butterfly style from around 1480, and a third depicts Francis Clopton who died in 1558.

There is an altar set against the east wall of the chapel and a double squint designed to provide priests with a view of the high altar when conducting Masses.

Clopton Chantry Chapel
The Clopton Chantry Chapel is a small chapel at the far north east corner of the church, accessed from the Clopton Chapel. This was the original Lady Chapel and is the oldest part of the current structure. After John Clopton's death in 1497, his will made provision for the chapel to be extended and refurbished and for him to be buried alongside his wife there. The chapel was then renamed, while the intended Chantry Chapel became the Lady Chapel.

The tomb of John Clopton and his wife is set in the wall leading into the chapel. Inside, the canopy vault displays faded portraits of the couple. Also displayed is a portrait of the risen Christ with a Latin text which, translated, reads Everyone who lives and believes in me shall never die. A series of empty niches in the south wall most likely once held statues of saints. Around the cornice, John Lydgate's poem "Testament" is presented in the form of a scroll along the roof, while his "Lamentation of our Lady Maria" is along the west wall.

Lady Chapel
The Lady Chapel is a separate building attached to the east end of the main church. In an unusual layout, it has a central sanctuary surrounded by a pillared ambulatory, reflecting its original intended use as a chantry chapel with John Clopton's tomb in its centre. Clopton was forced to abandon this plan when his wife died before the new building was completed and consecrated; so she was buried in the former Lady Chapel and John Clopton was subsequently interred next to her.

The stone carving seen in the Lady Chapel bears similarities to work at King's College Chapel, Cambridge and at Burwell Church in Cambridgeshire. It is known that the master mason employed there was Reginald Ely, the King's Mason, and although there is no documentary proof, it is believed that Ely was also responsible for the work at Holy Trinity, Long Melford.

The chapel was used as a school from 1670 until the early 18th century, and a multiplication table on the east wall serves as a reminder of this use. The steep gables of the roof also date from this period.

Martyn Chapel
The Martyn Chapel is situated to the south of the chancel. It contains the tombs of several members of the Martyn family, who were prominent local wool merchants in the 15th and 16th centuries, and who also acted as benefactors of the church. These include the tomb chest of Lawrence Martyn (died 1460) and his two wives. On the floor are the tomb slabs of Roger Martyn (died 1615) and his two wives Ursula and Margaret; and of Richard Martyn (died 1624) and his three wives.

Originally, the Martyn chapel contained an altar flanked by two gilded tabernacles, one displaying an image of Christ and the other an image of Our Lady of Pity. These tabernacles reached to the ceiling of the chapel, but were removed or destroyed during the English Reformation in the reign of King Edward VI.

Organ

The church has two pipe organs. The organ in the church is a two manual pipe organ dating from 1867 by J. W. Walker. A specification of this organ can be found on the National Pipe Organ Register.

The organ in the Lady Chapel is a small positive pipe organ. A specification of this organ can be found on the National Pipe Organ Register.

Glass
The medieval glass can be attributed to the Norwich School and dates from the mid- to the late-15th century. Described as "the best collection of medieval glass in Suffolk", it was recollected to its present location, in the north aisle, in the 1960s.

List of rectors
In common with other English churches, for much of its lifetime, the Rector was "presented" (appointed) by the church patron. Until its dissolution in 1539, the patron was the incumbent Abbot of the Benedictine Abbey of Bury St Edmunds; after this date, the patronage was held by a prominent local person, transferring either by bequest or by sale.

The list of rectors of Holy Trinity dates back to the 12th century, but there are gaps prior to 1309.

Parish status
The Parish of Long Melford is part of the Chadbrook Benefice. The other churches in the group are:
St George's Church, Shimplingthorne
St Peter and St Paul's Church, Alpheton
St Catherine's Church, Long Melford

Citations

References

See also

 Three hares

Long Melford
Grade I listed churches in Suffolk
Long Melford